is a Paralympic swimmer from Japan competing mainly in category S5 events.

Sakuko was a freestyle specialist who competed in the 2000 Summer Paralympics, she was part of the 4x50m freestyle team that won the gold medal in a new world record time.  Individually she swam in the 50m, 100m and 200m freestyle events but failed to make a final.

References

External links
 

Year of birth missing (living people)
Living people
Japanese female freestyle swimmers
Paralympic swimmers of Japan
Paralympic gold medalists for Japan
Paralympic medalists in swimming
Swimmers at the 2000 Summer Paralympics
Swimmers at the 2004 Summer Paralympics
Medalists at the 2000 Summer Paralympics
S5-classified Paralympic swimmers
21st-century Japanese women